The 1991 Haitian coup d'état took place on 29 September 1991, when President Jean-Bertrand Aristide, elected eight months earlier in the 1990–91 Haitian general election, was deposed by the Armed Forces of Haiti. Haitian military officers, primarily Army General Raoul Cédras, Army Chief of Staff Philippe Biamby and Chief of the National Police, Michel François led the coup. Aristide was sent into exile, his life only saved by the intervention of US, French and Venezuelan diplomats. Aristide would later return to power in 1994.

Background
The 1990–91 general election was heralded as the first democratic election in Haiti's history. Aristide, a populist Roman Catholic priest, was the most controversial candidate of his party, the National Front for Change and Democracy (FCND). He was one of the only church figures to speak out against repression during the Duvalier years. However, due to the popularity of his populist Lavalas movement ("the flood" in Haitian Creole), which advocated the use of legislation and popular mobilization for economic reform, an end to corruption, and justice for the victims of the Haitian military and the Tonton Macoutes, he received the majority of the vote, with 67.5%.

Despite having popular support, the transition of power was rocky. Aristide's political platform threatened the power of some of the Haitian elite, specifically those who supported the Duvalier family dictatorship. Aristide's main opposition was the Haitian army, on whom he attempted to enforce constitutional laws that had not previously been adhered to. These laws included the separation of the police from the army and its subsequent placement under the Ministry of Justice as well as the trial of military abuses against citizens by the military, when they were meant to be tried in civilian courts.

The Haitian right mobilized in response to the Lavalas movement. A coup attempt against Aristide had taken place on 6 January, even before his inauguration, when Roger Lafontant, a Tonton Macoute leader under Duvalier, seized the provisional President Ertha Pascal-Trouillot and declared himself President. After large numbers of Aristide supporters filled the streets in protest and Lafontant attempted to declare martial law, the Army crushed the incipient coup. Lafontant's trial was controversial, as he received a life sentence on the recommendation of Aristide, while the maximum sentence was set at 15 years.

On 27 September 1991 Aristide gave a speech that critics believe advocated for the use of necklacing - also called Pere Lebrun in Haiti - as a form of execution, potentially referring to necklacing as a "beautiful instrument." Others argue that Aristide is referring to the constitution, since necklacing is never explicitly mentioned and earlier in the same speech Aristide refers ambiguously in similar ways to using the constitution as an instrument or tool— "Your tool in hand, your instrument in hand, your constitution in hand!"

It has been suggested that Aristide also threatened elite  bourgeoisie families in that speech, for not supporting his government enough. A social network analysis of Haitian elites who participated in the coup has suggested that more central families were more likely to have been accused of participating in the coup and more likely to benefit financially.

Coup d'état
The coup was brief, with some conflict the night of 28 September 1991, but the bulk of the action taking place on 29 September, ending with Aristide deported to France in exile and Cédras announcing the success of the coup at 11 p.m. on the night of Monday, 30 September. On the night of 28 September, some army bases and police stations mutinied, aligning themselves with Cédras over the Aristide administration. At daybreak, soldiers fired on Aristide's residence and his armored personnel carrier as he traveled to the National Palace. Soldiers overtook the palace, captured Aristide and led him to army headquarters. There, Venezuelan, French, and US ambassadors successfully negotiated with coup leaders for Aristide's life. Aristide was forced into exile and flew to France, later visiting the United States and speaking before the United Nations.

An outburst of popular protest associated with the coup also claimed lives. Silvio Claude, the leader of the Christian Democratic Party and a critic of both the Duvaliers and Aristide, was murdered by a mob. Roger Lafontant was also murdered in prison during the coup, however the circumstances surrounding his death have never been made clear.

Aftermath

The army justified the coup as a necessary intervention, claiming that Aristide was meddling in army affairs. Cédras announced his victory at 11 p.m., on 29 September, via a televised broadcast, saying, "Today, the armed forces find themselves obligated to assume the heavy responsibility to keep the ship of state afloat. After seven months of democratic experience, the country once again finds itself a prey to the horrors of uncertainty. With all Haitians we will bring the ship to port." At least 26 people were killed and 200 wounded in the fighting, and gunfire lasted through the night.

During the Aristide government the military's reputation in regard to human rights began to improve, however this was quickly reversed after the coup. The military targeted pro-Aristide elected officials, as well as rural development and peasant organizations, neighborhood and community associations, and trade unions. Literacy, pro-democracy, students' and women's groups were also persecuted. Civilian deaths increased during this period, as did incidents of mass arrests without warrants. Before his assassination in 1993, pro-democracy activist Antoine Izmery claimed, that 10,000 people had died as a result of political violence following the coup. Around 250,000 people had fled the city of Port-au-Prince by December 1991, fleeing not only political violence but economic hardship. However, persecution was not limited to the cities. Peasants made up a large part of Aristide's voter base, and thus were subject to military violence, including the destruction of food-storage silos and the killing of livestock.

The military regime reduced freedom of the press by silencing radio stations, the most important news medium in the country. On the first day of the coup, at least 10 radio stations were destroyed or shut down. Radio personnel were arrested, tortured, and even executed. Significant arrests include those of Jacques Gary Simeon (head of Radio Caraibes), Paul Jean-Mario (a reporter for Radio Antilles), and Felix Lamy (director of Radio Galaxie).

The military's human rights abuses sparked a mass exodus of Haitian Nationals fleeing by boat. A tent camp was set up at the Guantanamo Bay Naval Base for those who were picked up by the US Coast Guard. As of 4 February 1992, more than 14,000 Haitian refugees had arrived at Guantanamo, but only 3609 qualified to apply for political asylum. The Bush administration began repatriation of refugees on 3 February 1992. On 24 May, Executive Order 12807 was issued, which ended all screening of the Haitian Nationals. This order violated the international principle of nonrefoulement, although the administration argued that this was irrelevant and claimed the reason for the refugee crisis was economic, due to the economic embargo, and not due to political persecution. Given the direct correlation between the refugee crisis and an uptick in political violence in Haiti, it is clear that the Bush administration's claim failed to encompass the whole situation. The Supreme Court supported the administration's rejection of refugees, deciding that the Refugee Convention did not apply on the high seas. After declaring its intention to close the Guantanamo camp, the US began to return Haitians immediately after their interception, without allowing them to apply for asylum. The only way to apply for asylum now was through the US embassy in Port-au-Prince.

International response

International organizations 
Early on, international organizations such as the Organization of American States (OAS) and the United Nations condemned the coup and expressed their support for Aristide's regime. The OAS implemented a trade embargo in October 1991. On 24 November 1992, the UN adopted a resolution urging member states to impose a trade embargo, although it did not impose a world-wide oil and arms embargo until 23 June 1993. The Governor's Island Agreement, signed on 3 July 1993, attempted to forge a compromise between Aristide and Cedras, in that sanctions would be lifted following Aristide's return to power by 30 October. The accord also promised amnesty for coup leaders, assistance in modernizing the Haitian army, and the establishment of a new Haitian police force. Sanctions were suspended following the appointment of a Prime Minister chosen by Aristide, but reimposed in October 1993 following accusations of renewed human rights violations by the military regime.

The economic blockade had severe effects on an already-impoverished country. 140,000 private-sector jobs were lost. To compensate with the lack of fuel, people cut down more trees, which accelerated deforestation. The lack of electricity had a massive impact on public health, as vaccines and medications could not be preserved.

United States response 
Initially, the Bush administration followed the international community in denouncing the military coup, calling for a restoration of democracy and the reinstatement of Aristide. However, they soon reversed their policy, stating that the return of Aristide was not a requirement for the restoration of democracy. The administration's willingness to compromise with the military junta was perceived as US government support of Cédras, and sparked a number of protests by Haitian-Americans.

The Clinton administration was more supportive of reinstating a broad democracy in Haiti. After large, pro-Aristide demonstrations in the United States, President Bill Clinton, with the support of the United Nations, pressured the coup regime to step down. On 31 July 1994, United Nations Security Council Resolution 940 authorized a United States-led multinational force under unified command and control to restore Aristide to office, under Operation Uphold Democracy. United States military forces were deployed in Haiti, and on 15 October 1994, the Clinton administration returned Aristide to Haiti to complete his term in office.

Response in the region 
The response of other Caribbean states to the crisis varied, but was generally anti-refugee. The Dominican Republic, which supported the Haitian military regime, sought to stem the flow of over 30,000 refugees with an increased police and army presence on the border. The Bahamas had a similar response to refugees. Even countries such as Jamaica who allowed refugee settlement offered minimal processing. Some countries, such as Venezuela, directly refused to accept refugees for settlement, despite displaying support for the Aristide regime. Following Aristide's return in November 1994, a number of Caribbean states introduced programs for the repatriation of Haitians living in their countries. The most significant numbers came from the Bahamas, the Dominican Republic, and Turks and Caicos.

US involvement 

Francois and Biamby received military training in the US: Biamby received infantry training at Fort Benning, Georgia, and Francois received small-arms and ammunition repair training at the Army Ordnance School in Aberdeen, Maryland, and also at the Savanna Army Depot in Illinois.  It is frequently reported that Cedras also received US training, but the Pentagon denies having evidence of this. It is unknown to what degree US assistance empowered or assisted the leaders of the coup, and to what degree the involvement of the CIA aided or subverted the regime.

Despite the US role in the 1994 Operation Uphold Democracy to reinstall Aristide to power, questions remain about its involvement in the coup itself. Emmanuel Constant later reported that CIA agents were present with Cédras at the army headquarters during the coup, but the CIA denied prior knowledge. Additionally, the CIA "paid key members of the coup regime forces, identified as drug traffickers, for information from the mid-1980s at least until the coup."

After the coup 
Aristide was returned to power on 15 October 1994 and remained in power until 1996, following a democratic election and a peaceful transferral of power. He then returned to the presidency in 2001, but was ousted again in a 2004 coup d'état.

Prior to Aristide's reinstatement Cedras and Biamby left the country and settled in Panama. Both, in addition to Francois, were convicted for their roles in the Raboteau Massacre and received the mandatory sentence of forced labor for life. However, as all three men were convicted in absentia and have not returned to Haiti, they have not served their sentences.

Members of the coup regime, notably the Chief of National Police, Michel François, were accused of drug smuggling at a much greater rate than before the coup. A 1992 US State Department report noted that Aristide was "planning new policies and institutions to combat narcotics trafficking, [and] his ouster... crippled narcotics control efforts in Haiti." An internal 1993 US Congress memo stated that "all those jailed for drug-trafficking have been released and... Michel François has personally supervised the landing of planes carrying drugs and weapons." Francois was arrested in Honduras in 1997 and held on drug charges for several months, but released after a US extradition request was denied. His current whereabouts are unknown.

References

Haitian military junta (1991-1994)
Haiti
Coup d'etat
Haitian coup d'etat
Military coups in Haiti
September 1991 events in North America